In mathematics, ergodicity expresses the idea that a point of a moving system, either a dynamical system or a stochastic process, will eventually visit all parts of the space that the system moves in, in a uniform and random sense. This implies that the average behavior of the system can be deduced from the trajectory of a "typical" point. Equivalently, a sufficiently large collection of random samples from a process can represent the average statistical properties of the entire process. Ergodicity is a property of the system; it is a statement that the system cannot be reduced or factored into smaller components. Ergodic theory is the study of systems possessing ergodicity.

Ergodic systems occur in a broad range of systems in physics and in geometry. This can be roughly understood to be due to a common phenomenon: the motion of particles, that is, geodesics on a hyperbolic manifold are divergent; when that manifold is compact, that is, of finite size, those orbits return to the same general area, eventually filling the entire space.

Ergodic systems capture the common-sense, every-day notions of randomness, such that smoke might come to fill all of a smoke-filled room, or that a block of metal might eventually come to have the same temperature throughout, or that flips of a fair coin may come up heads and tails half the time. A stronger concept than ergodicity is that of mixing, which aims to mathematically describe the common-sense notions of mixing, such as mixing drinks or mixing cooking ingredients.

The proper mathematical formulation of ergodicity is founded on the formal definitions of measure theory and dynamical systems, and rather specifically on the notion of a measure-preserving dynamical system. The origins of ergodicity lie in statistical physics, where Ludwig Boltzmann formulated the ergodic hypothesis.

Informal explanation

Ergodicity occurs in broad settings in physics and mathematics. All of these settings are unified by a common mathematical description, that of the measure-preserving dynamical system. An informal description of this, and a definition of ergodicity with respect to it, is given immediately below. This is followed by a description of ergodicity in stochastic processes. They are one and the same, despite using dramatically different notation and language.

Measure-preserving dynamical systems
The mathematical definition of ergodicity aims to capture ordinary every-day ideas about randomness. This includes ideas about systems that move in such a way as to (eventually) fill up all of space, such as diffusion and Brownian motion, as well as common-sense notions of mixing, such as mixing paints, drinks, cooking ingredients, industrial process mixing, smoke in a smoke-filled room, the dust in Saturn's rings and so on.  To provide a solid mathematical footing, descriptions of ergodic systems begin with the definition of a measure-preserving dynamical system. This is written as 

The set  is understood to be the total space to be filled: the mixing bowl, the smoke-filled room, etc. The measure  is understood to define the natural volume of the space  and of its subspaces. Thus, conventionally,  consists of the measurable subsets—the subsets that do have a volume. It is always taken to be a Borel set—the collection of subsets that can be constructed by taking intersections, unions and set complements of open sets; these can always be taken to be measurable.

The time evolution of the system is described by a map . Given some subset , its map  will in general be a deformed version of  – it is squashed or stretched, folded or cut into pieces. Mathematical examples include the baker's map and the horseshoe map, both inspired by bread-making. Such a system is "measure-preserving" (area-preserving, volume-preserving).

A formal difficulty arises when one tries to reconcile the volume of sets with the need to preserve their size under a map. Worse, a single point  has no size. It has the important property of not losing track of where things came from. More strongly, it has the important property that any (measure-preserving) map  is the inverse of some map . The proper definition of a volume-preserving map is one for which  because  describes all the pieces-parts that  came from.

One is now interested in studying the time evolution of the system. If every set  behaves in this way, the system is a conservative system, placed in contrast to a dissipative system, where some subsets  wander away, never to be returned to. An example would be water running downhill: once it's run down, it will never come back up again. The lake that forms at the bottom of this river can, however, become well-mixed. The ergodic decomposition theorem states that every ergodic system can be split into two parts: the conservative part, and the dissipative part.

Mixing is a stronger statement than ergodicity. Other notions of mixing include strong and weak mixing, which describe the notion that the mixed substances intermingle everywhere, in equal proportion. This can be non-trivial, as practical experience of trying to mix sticky, gooey substances shows.

Processes
The above discussion appeals to a physical sense of a volume. The volume does not have to literally be some portion of 3D space; it can be some abstract volume. This is generally the case in statistical systems, where the volume (the measure) is given by the probability. The total volume corresponds to probability one. This correspondence works because the axioms of probability theory are identical to those of measure theory; these are the Kolmogorov axioms.

The idea of a volume can be very abstract. Consider, for example, the set of all possible coin-flips: the set of infinite sequences of heads and tails. Assigning the volume of 1 to this space, it is clear that half of all such sequences start with heads, and half start with tails. One can slice up this volume in other ways: one can say "I don't care about the first  coin-flips; but I want the 'th of them to be heads, and then I don't care about what comes after that". The volume of this space is again one-half.

The above is enough to build up a measure-preserving dynamical system, in its entirety. The set of all possible intersections, unions and complements of the cylinder sets then form the Borel set  defined above. In formal terms, the cylinder sets form the base for a topology on the space  of all possible infinite-length coin-flips. All together, these form the axioms of a sigma-additive measure; measure-preserving dynamical systems always use sigma-additive measures. For coin flips, this measure is called the Bernoulli measure.

For the coin-flip process, the time-evolution operator  is the shift operator that says "throw away the first coin-flip, and keep the rest". Formally, if  is a sequence of coin-flips, then . The measure is obviously shift-invariant: as long as we are talking about some set  where the first coin-flip  is the "don't care" value, then the volume  does not change: . In order to avoid talking about the first coin-flip, it is easier to define  as inserting a "don't care" value into the first position: . This is again an example of why  is used in the formal definitions.

The above development takes a random process, the Bernoulli process, and converts it to a measure-preserving dynamical system  The same conversion (equivalence, isomorphism) can be applied to any stochastic process. In the present example, a sequence of coin flips, where half are heads, and half are tails, is a "typical" sequence.

There are several important points to be made about the Bernoulli process. If one writes 0 for tails and 1 for heads, one gets the set of all infinite strings of binary digits. These correspond to the base-two expansion of real numbers. Explicitly, given a sequence , the corresponding real number is

The statement that the Bernoulli process is ergodic is equivalent to the statement that the real numbers are uniformly distributed.  The set of all such strings can be written in a variety of ways:  This set is the Cantor set, sometimes called the Cantor space to avoid confusion with the Cantor function

In the end, these are all "the same thing".

The Cantor set plays key roles in many branches of mathematics. In recreational mathematics, it underpins the period-doubling fractals; in analysis, it appears in a vast variety of theorems. A key one for stochastic processes is the Wold decomposition, which states that any stationary process can be decomposed into a pair of uncorrelated processes, one deterministic, and the other being a moving average process.

The Ornstein isomorphism theorem states that every stationary stochastic process is equivalent to a Bernoulli scheme (a Bernoulli process with an N-sided (and possibly unfair) gaming die).  Other results include that every non-dissipative ergodic system is equivalent to the Markov odometer, sometimes called an "adding machine" because it looks like elementary-school addition, that is, taking a base-N digit sequence, adding one, and propagating the carry bits. The proof of equivalence is very abstract; understanding the result is not: by adding one at each time step, every possible state of the odometer is visited, until it rolls over, and starts again. Likewise, ergodic systems visit each state, uniformly, moving on to the next, until they have all been visited.

Systems that generate (infinite) sequences of N letters are studied by means of symbolic dynamics. Important special cases include subshifts of finite type and sofic systems.

History and etymology
At the same time it is also claimed to be a derivation of ergomonode, coined by Boltzmann in a relatively obscure paper from 1884. The etymology appears to be contested in other ways as well.

The idea of ergodicity was born in the field of thermodynamics, where it was necessary to relate the individual states of gas molecules to the temperature of a gas as a whole and its time evolution thereof. In order to do this, it was necessary to state what exactly it means for gases to mix well together, so that thermodynamic equilibrium could be defined with mathematical rigor. Once the theory was well developed in physics, it was rapidly formalized and extended, so that ergodic theory has long been an independent area of mathematics in itself. As part of that progression, more than one slightly different definition of ergodicity and multitudes of interpretations of the concept in different fields coexist.

For example, in classical physics the term implies that a system satisfies the ergodic hypothesis of thermodynamics, the relevant state space being position and momentum space.

In dynamical systems theory the state space is usually taken to be a more general phase space. On the other hand in coding theory the state space is often discrete in both time and state, with less concomitant structure. In all those fields the ideas of time average and ensemble average can also carry extra baggage as well—as is the case with the many possible thermodynamically relevant partition functions used to define ensemble averages in physics, back again. As such the measure theoretic formalization of the concept also serves as a unifying discipline. In 1913 Michel Plancherel proved the strict impossibility for ergodicity for a purely mechanical system.

Occurrence
A review of ergodicity in physics, and in geometry follows. In all cases, the notion of ergodicity is exactly the same as that for dynamical systems; there is no difference, except for outlook, notation, style of thinking and the journals where results are published.

In physics
Physical systems can be split into three categories: classical mechanics, which describes machines with a finite number of moving parts, quantum mechanics, which describes the structure of atoms, and statistical mechanics, which describes gases, liquids, solids; this includes condensed matter physics.

The case of classical mechanics is discussed in the next section, on ergodicity in geometry. As to quantum mechanics, there is no universal quantum definition of ergodocity or even chaos (see quantum chaos). However, there is a quantum ergodicity theorem stating that the expectation value of an operator converges to the corresponding microcanonical classical average in the semiclassical limit . Nevertheless, the theorem does not imply that all eigenstates of the Hamiltionian whose classical counterpart is chaotic are features and random. For example, the quantum ergodicity theorem do not exclude the existence of non-ergodic states such as quantum scars. In addition to the conventional scarring, there are two other types of quantum scarring, which further illustrate the weak-ergodicity breaking in quantum chaotic systems: perturbation-induced and many-body quantum scars.

This section reviews ergodicity in statistical mechanics. The above abstract definition of a volume is required as the appropriate setting for definitions of ergodicity in physics. Consider a container of liquid, or gas, or plasma, or other collection of atoms or particles. None-the-less, for  close to the Avogadro number, this is obviously a very large space. This space is called the canonical ensemble.

A physical system is said to be ergodic if any representative point of the system eventually comes to visit the entire volume of the system. For the above example, this implies that any given atom not only visits every part of the box  with uniform probability, but it does so with every possible velocity, with probability given by the Boltzmann distribution for that velocity (so, uniform with respect to that measure).  The ergodic hypothesis states that physical systems actually are ergodic. Multiple time scales are at work: gasses and liquids appear to be ergodic over short time scales. Ergodicity in a solid can be viewed in terms of the vibrational modes or phonons, as obviously the atoms in a solid do not exchange locations. Glasses present a challenge to the ergodic hypothesis; time scales are assumed to be in the millions of years, but results are contentious. Spin glasses present particular difficulties.

Formal mathematical proofs of ergodicity in statistical physics are hard to come by; most high-dimensional many-body systems are assumed to be ergodic, without mathematical proof. Exceptions include the dynamical billiards, which model billiard ball-type collisions of atoms in an ideal gas or plasma. The first hard-sphere ergodicity theorem was for Sinai's billiards, which considers two balls, one of them taken as being stationary, at the origin. As the second ball collides, it moves away; applying periodic boundary conditions, it then returns to collide again. By appeal to homogeneity, this return of the "second" ball can instead be taken to be "just some other atom" that has come into range, and is moving to collide with the atom at the origin (which can be taken to be just "any other atom".) This is one of the few formal proofs that exist; there are no equivalent statements e.g. for atoms in a liquid, interacting via van der Waals forces, even if it would be common sense to believe that such systems are ergodic (and mixing).  More precise physical arguments can be made, though.

In geometry
Ergodicity is a widespread phenomenon in the study of Riemannian manifolds. A quick sequence of examples, from simple to complicated, illustrates this point.

The geodesic flow of a flat torus following any irrational direction is ergodic; informally this means that when drawing a straight line in a square starting at any point, and with an irrational angle with respect to the sides, if every time one meets a side one starts over on the opposite side with the same angle, the line will eventually meet every subset of positive measure. More generally on any flat surface there are many ergodic directions for the geodesic flow.

There are similar results for negatively curved compact Riemann surfaces; note that in this case the definition of geodesic flow is much more involved since there is no notion of constant direction on a non-flat surface. More generally the geodesic flow on a negatively curved compact Riemannian manifolds is ergodic, in fact it satisfies the stronger property of being an Anosov flow.

In finance
Models used in finance and investment assume ergodicity, explicitly or implicitly. The ergodic assumption is prevalent in modern portfolio theory, discounted cash flow (DCF) models, and aggregate indicator models that infuse macroeconomics, among others.

The situations modeled by these theories can be useful. But often they are only useful during much, but not all, of any particular time period under study. They can therefore miss some of the largest deviations from the standard model, such as financial crises, debt crises and systemic risk in the banking system that occur only infrequently.

Nassim Nicholas Taleb has argued that a very important part of empirical reality in finance and investment is non-ergodic. An even statistical distribution of probabilities, where the system returns to every possible state an infinite number of times, is simply not the case we observe in situations where “absorbing states" are reached, a state where ruin is seen. The death of an individual, or total loss of everything, or the devolution or dismemberment of a nation state and the legal regime that accompanied it, are all absorbing states. Thus, in finance, path dependence matters. A path where an individual, firm or country hits a "stop"—an absorbing barrier, "anything that prevents people with skin in the game from emerging from it, and to which the system will invariably tend. Let us call these situations ruin, as the entity cannot emerge from the condition. The central problem is that if there is a possibility of ruin, cost benefit analyses are no longer possible."—will be non-ergodic.  All traditional models based on standard probabilistic statistics break down in these extreme situations.

In Social Sciences
In the social sciences the ergodicity concept surfaces as group level data often gives a poor indication of individual level variation, as individual standard deviations (SDs) tend to be almost eight times larger than group level SDs of the same people. Subsequently a third of the individual observations falls outside a 99.9% confidence interval of group level data.

Definition for discrete-time systems

Formal definition
Let  be a measurable space.

In other words there are no -invariant subsets up to measure 0 (with respect to ). Recall that  preserving  (or  being -invariant) means that  for all  (see also measure-preserving dynamical system).

Examples
The simplest example is when  is a finite set and  the counting measure. Then a self-map of  preserves  if and only if it is a bijection, and it is ergodic if and only if  has only one orbit (that is, for every  there exists  such that ). For example, if  then the cycle  is ergodic, but the permutation  is not (it has the two invariant subsets  and ).

Equivalent formulations
The definition given above admits the following immediate reformulations: 
 for every  with positive measure we have ;
 for every two sets  of positive measure, there exists  such that ;

Importantly for applications, the condition in the last characterisation can be restricted to square-integrable functions only:
 If  and  then  is constant almost everywhere.

Further examples

Bernoulli shifts and subshifts

Periodic sequences give finitely supported measures. More interestingly, there are infinitely-supported ones which are subshifts of finite type.

Irrational rotations

Let  be the unit circle , with its Lebesgue measure . If  then  is not ergodic for the Lebesgue measure as it has infinitely many finite orbits. On the other hand, if  is irrational then  is ergodic.

Arnold's cat map

Let  be the 2-torus. Then any element  defines a self-map of  since . When  one obtains the so-called Arnold's cat map, which is ergodic for the Lebesgue measure on the torus.

Ergodic theorems

Formally this means that 

The mean ergodic theorem of J. von Neumann is a similar, weaker statement about averaged translates of square-integrable functions.

Related properties

Dense orbits

This is not an equivalence since for a transformation which is not uniquely ergodic, but for which there is an ergodic measure with full support , for any other ergodic measure  the measure  is not ergodic for  but its orbits are dense in the support. Explicit examples can be constructed with shift-invariant measures.

Mixing

A transformation  of a probability measure space  is said to be mixing for the measure  if for any measurable sets  the following holds: 

It is immediate that a mixing transformation is also ergodic (taking  to be a -stable subset and  its complement). The converse is not true, for example a rotation with irrational angle on the circle (which is ergodic per the examples above) is not mixing (for a sufficiently small interval its successive images will not intersect itself most of the time). Bernoulli shifts are mixing, and so is Arnold's cat map.

This notion of mixing is sometimes called strong mixing, as opposed to weak mixing which means that

Proper ergodicity
The transformation  is said to be properly ergodic if it does not have an orbit of full measure.

Definition for continuous-time dynamical systems
The definition is essentially the same for continuous-time dynamical systems as for a single transformation.

Examples

Let ; then if  this is ergodic for the Lebesgue measure.

Ergodic flows
Further examples of ergodic flows are:
 Billiards in convex Euclidean domains; 
 the geodesic flow of a negatively curved Riemannian manifold of finite volume is ergodic (for the normalised volume measure); 
 the horocycle flow on a hyperbolic manifold of finite volume is ergodic (for the normalised volume measure)

Ergodicity in compact metric spaces
If  is a compact metric space it is naturally endowed with the σ-algebra of Borel sets.

Functional analysis interpretation
A very powerful alternate definition of ergodic measures can be given using the theory of Banach spaces. Given a continuous transformation  of  the subset  of -invariant measures is a closed convex subset, and a measure is ergodic for  if and only if it is an extreme point of this convex.

Existence of ergodic measures
Hence a transformation of a compact metric space always admits ergodic measures.

Ergodic decomposition
In general an invariant measure need not be ergodic, but as a consequence of Choquet theory it can always be expressed as the barycenter of a probability measure on the set of ergodic measures. This is referred to as the ergodic decomposition of the measure.

Example
In particular  is the ergodic decomposition of the counting measure.

Continuous systems

Unique ergodicity

In the examples considered above, irrational rotations of the circle are uniquely ergodic; shift maps are not.

Probabilistic interpretation: ergodic processes

This is a particular case of the notions discussed above.

The simplest case is that of an independent and identically distributed process which corresponds to the shift map described above. Another important case is that of a Markov chain which is discussed in detail below.

A similar interpretation holds for continuous-time stochastic processes though the construction of the measurable structure of the action is more complicated.

Ergodicity of Markov chains

The dynamical system associated with a Markov chain

Let  be a finite set.

Using this data we can define a probability measure  on the set  with its product σ-algebra by giving the measures of the cylinders as follows:

Stationarity of  then means that the measure  is invariant under the shift map .

Criterion for ergodicity

The measure  is always ergodic for the shift map if the associated Markov chain is irreducible (any state can be reached with positive probability from any other state in a finite number of steps).

The hypotheses above imply that there is a unique stationary measure for the Markov chain.

Note that in probability theory the Markov chain is called ergodic if in addition each state is aperiodic (the times where the return probability is positive are not multiples of a single integer >1). This is not necessary for the invariant measure to be ergodic; hence the notions of "ergodicity" for a Markov chain and the associated shift-invariant measure are different (the one for the chain is strictly stronger).

Moreover the criterion is an "if and only if" if all communicating classes in the chain are recurrent and we consider all stationary measures.

Examples

Counting measure
If  for all  then the stationary measure is the counting measure, the measure  is the product of counting measures. The Markov chain is ergodic, so the shift example from above is a special case of the criterion.

Non-ergodic Markov chains
Markov chains with recurring communicating classes are not irreducible are not ergodic, and this can be seen immediately as follows. A very simple example of that is the chain on  given by the matrix  (both states are stationary).

A periodic chain
The Markov chain on  given by the matrix  is irreducible but periodic. However the shift is not mixing for this measure, as for the sets 

and 

we have  but

Generalisations

The definition of ergodicity also makes sense for group actions.

For non-abelian groups there might not be invariant measures even on compact metric spaces. However the definition of ergodicity carries over unchanged if one replaces invariant measures by quasi-invariant measures.

Important examples are the action of a semisimple Lie group (or a lattice therein) on its Furstenberg boundary.

A measurable equivalence relation it is said to be ergodic if all saturated subsets are either null or conull.

Notes

References

External links

 Karma Dajani and Sjoerd Dirksin, "A Simple Introduction to Ergodic Theory"

Ergodic theory